China World Trade Center Tower III is a supertall skyscraper with 74 floors, 5 underground floors, and 30 elevators in Beijing, China. It is the third phase of development of the China World Trade Center complex in Beijing's central business district of Chaoyang at the junction  of the East Third Ring Road and Jianguomen Outer Street (Jian Guo Men Wai Dajie). The building bears a striking resemblance to the original Twin Towers of the World Trade Center in New York City, which were destroyed during the September 11th, 2001 attacks. It is the second tallest building in Beijing.

It is used for office and hotel space, with retail at its base. The building houses a 278-room 5-star hotel, a 1,600-seat grand ballroom and a carpark. The office space is located on floors 1 to 55. Floors 64 to 77 are occupied by the China World Summit Wing Hotel with a lobby on the 64th floor. Floors 79 to 81 are used for a restaurant and an observation deck. The four elevators that lead directly from the lobby to the 64th floor are Schindler 7000 and reach a maximum speed of 10 metres per second.

The building was constructed by the architectural group: Skidmore, Owings, and Merrill - the same company that is credited with the construction of One World Trade Center in New York City, which was constructed after the September 11 terrorist attacks.

In 2010 the China World Trade Center Tower III became the world's tallest building with a roof-top helipad, surpassing the US Bank Tower. Its helipad is 330 m (1,083 feet) high  compared to the US Bank Tower's helipad at 310.3 m (1,018 feet). As of Dec, 2018, China World Trade Center Tower III is the second tallest building with a roof-top helipad, with the tallest being the Guangzhou International Finance Center tower which is located in Guangzhou with a height of 439 m (1,439 feet) high.

See also

 China World Trade Center
 Guangzhou International Finance Center 
 List of tallest buildings in Beijing

References

External links
 Official website (in Chinese)
 China World Tower on CTBUH Skyscraper Center
 
 Skidmore, Owings, Merrill LLP Details

Skyscraper office buildings in Beijing
Office buildings completed in 2009
Skidmore, Owings & Merrill buildings
Buildings and structures in Chaoyang District, Beijing
World Trade Centers
Skyscraper hotels in Beijing
Retail buildings in China